MRSV may refer to:

Maize red stripe virus, a plant virus
Member of the Royal Society of Victoria, a post-nominal title
Multi-role support vessels in the Indian Navy amphibious vessel acquisition project
The ICAO code for San Vito de Java Airport in Costa Rica

See also
Multi-role support ship (disambiguation)